Liliya Anatoliyvna Ludan (born 2 June 1969 in Kyiv) is a Ukrainian luger who has competed since 1985. Competing at the Winter Olympics, she earned her best finish of sixth in the women's singles event both in 2002 and in 2006. Ludan is a member of the Kolos Sports Society.

Ludan's best finish at the FIL World Luge Championships was seventh in the women's singles event at Sigulda in 2003. Her best finish at the FIL European Luge Championships was fifth in the women's singles event at Altenberg in 2002.

Ludan carried the Ukrainian flag during the opening ceremony of the 2010 Winter Olympics.

References
 1998 luge women's singles results
 2002 luge women's singles results
 2006 luge women's singles results
 FIL-Luge profile
 Ludan to carry flag for the 2010 Winter Olympics. - accessed 11 February 2010.

External links
 
 
 
 

1969 births
Living people
Ukrainian female lugers
Olympic lugers of Ukraine
Lugers at the 1998 Winter Olympics
Lugers at the 2002 Winter Olympics
Lugers at the 2006 Winter Olympics
Lugers at the 2010 Winter Olympics
Sportspeople from Kyiv